Carlos Paulo Martins Carneiro (born 27 December 1975) is a Portuguese former professional footballer who played as a striker.

He played mostly for Paços de Ferreira during his 16-year senior career, amassing Primeira Liga totals of 172 matches and 24 goals over eight seasons and also representing in competition Vitória de Guimarães and Gil Vicente.

Playing career
During his early career, Paços de Ferreira-born Carneiro played for F.C. Paços de Ferreira (he would represent boyhood club on three separate stints) and S.C. Covilhã, the latter in the third division. In summer 2003, after his second spell at Paços, he signed with Vitória de Guimarães, moving in January 2005 to fellow Primeira Liga team Gil Vicente FC.

Carneiro spent the 2006–07 season in Greece with Panionios FC, and began the following in England at Football League One side Walsall, signing on 17 July 2007 subject to international clearance. However, he left the latter after having his contract terminated on 5 November, rejoining his first professional club in January 2008.

After an additional one and a half years at Paços, being irregularly used and almost always as a late substitute, the 33-year-old Carneiro left for F.C. Vizela in the third tier. In January 2010, he joined F.C. Penafiel of the second.

Management career
In May 2010, after helping his last team easily retain their status, Carneiro retired from football and rejoined main club Paços Ferreira as its director of football. Six years later, in the same capacity, he signed with C.D. Tondela.

On 20 May 2019, Carneiro returned to Paços de Ferreira still as a sporting director.

References

External links

1975 births
Living people
People from Paços de Ferreira
Sportspeople from Porto District
Portuguese footballers
Association football forwards
Primeira Liga players
Liga Portugal 2 players
Segunda Divisão players
F.C. Paços de Ferreira players
A.D. Lousada players
S.C. Covilhã players
Vitória S.C. players
Gil Vicente F.C. players
F.C. Vizela players
F.C. Penafiel players
Super League Greece players
Panionios F.C. players
English Football League players
Walsall F.C. players
Portuguese expatriate footballers
Expatriate footballers in Greece
Expatriate footballers in England
Portuguese expatriate sportspeople in Greece
Portuguese expatriate sportspeople in England